HMS Lyra was one of 20  (later H-class) destroyers built for the Royal Navy that served in the First World War. The Acorn class were smaller than the preceding  but oil-fired and better armed. Launched in 1910, Lyra was part of the winning side in war games that took place the following year, although the destroyer sustained damage due to fast running. At the start of the war, the ship served with the Second Destroyer Flotilla of the Grand Fleet, and spent most of the war in anti-submarine warfare, mainly protecting merchant ships from attack. Despite being involved in many actions, the destroyer did not sink any enemy boats. Lyra ended the war in Gibraltar. After the Armistice, the destroyer was placed in reserve before being sold to be broken up in 1921.

Design and description

After the preceding coal-burning , the  saw a return to oil-firing. Unlike previous destroyer designs, where the individual yards had been given discretion within the parameters set by the Admiralty, the Acorn class were a set, with the machinery the only major variation between the different ships. This enabled costs to be reduced. The class was later renamed H class.

Displacement was  normal and  full load. Power was provided by Parsons steam turbines, fed by four Yarrow boilers. Parsons supplied a complex of seven turbines, a high-pressure and two low pressure for high speed, two turbines for cruising and two for running astern, driving three shafts. The high-pressure turbine drove the centre shaft, the remainder being distributed amongst two wing-shafts. Three funnels were fitted, the foremost tall and thin, the central short and thick and the aft narrow. On trial, Lyra achieved .

The more efficient use of deck space enabled a larger armament to be mounted. A single BL  Mk VIII gun was carried on the forecastle and another aft. Two single QF 12-pounder  guns were mounted between the first two funnels. Two rotating  torpedo tubes were mounted aft of the funnels, with two reloads carried, and a searchlight fitted between the tubes. The destroyer was later modified to carry a single Vickers QF 3-pounder  anti-aircraft gun and depth charges for anti-submarine warfare. The ship's complement was 72 officers and ratings.

Construction and career
The 20 destroyers of the Acorn class were ordered by the Admiralty under the 1909–1910 Naval Programme. One of three in the class sourced from John I. Thornycroft & Company, Lyra was laid down at the company's Woolston shipyard on 8 December 1909, launched on 4 October 1910 and completed in February 1911. The ship was the fourth ship in Royal Navy service to be named after the constellation.

Lyra joined the  Second Destroyer Flotilla on 27 February 1911, replacing the destroyer  in the flotilla.  On 7 April 1911, the ship ran aground on the west of the Orkney island of Gairsay, but sustained no damage. On 8 August 1911, the destroyer participated in a fleet exercise in the Irish Sea, pitting two fleets against each other. Despite being part of the winning "blue" fleet, the destroyer this time did suffer damage as the high speed manoeuvres meant that rivets were strained so much that the water entered the hull, mixing with oil in the bunkers. Lyra remained part of the Second Destroyer Flotilla in 1913.

In August 1914, the Flotilla became part of the Grand Fleet and the destroyers were deployed to Devonport to undertake escort duties. On 16 October, the vessel was leading four destroyers of the flotilla when the German submarine  was sighted. The submarine had recently sunk the protected cruiser  and lined up to torpedo Lyra and sister ship  too. Before the torpedo destined for Lyra could be launched, the destroyers raised the alarm and drove the submarine away. Not being equipped with depth charges, they could not attack a submerged target and the submarine escaped.

For much of the remainder of the war, Lyra was involved in escorting ships, both individually and in convoy. For example, on 3 December 1916, the vessel escorted troop ships to Liverpool. On 17 January 1917, Lyra was called on to escort more troops, this time destined for Sierra Leone. When returning from this on 22 January, the destroyer rescued the merchant ship SS Bendoran, which was being attacked by the German submarine  on a voyage from Hong Kong. The destroyer drove the submarine away without loss of life on the submarine's intended victim, but one officer aboard Lyra was injured in a friendly fire incident, shot by accident by the QF 12 pounder aboard the Bendoran. Less successful was the defence of the Japanese Prince, sunk while under escort by the submarine  on 10 February. The destroyer did, however, save the crew. Once again, the submarine escaped, despite Lyra attacking with depth charges. A similar story unfolded on 7 August, when the destroyer drove away  from attacking the troopship SS Orama without loss.

During 1918, the destroyer was transferred to the Mediterranean Fleet based at Gibraltar. Lyra formed part of the barrage across the Strait of Gibraltar, designed to detect and, if possible, sink German submarines returning from the Mediterranean Sea to their bases in the North Sea. On 8 November, the destroyer spotted what was thought to be a submarine and attacked, but the target escaped unscathed. After the Armistice, the Royal Navy returned to a peacetime level of strength and both the number of ships and the amount of personnel needed to be reduced to save money. Lyra was decommissioned and place in reserve at Portsmouth. The vessel was sold to be broken up at Milford Haven to Thos. W. Ward on 9 May 1921.

Pennant numbers

References

Citations

Bibliography

1910 ships
Lyra (1910)
Ships built by John I. Thornycroft & Company
Lyra (1910)